The American rock band Stone Sour has released six studio albums, one live album and twenty-two singles. The band has also released twenty-four music videos. Stone Sour formed in Des Moines, Iowa in 1992 but did not release an album until 2002. The band comprises vocalist Corey Taylor, guitarists Christian Martucci and Josh Rand, drummer Roy Mayorga, and bassist Johny Chow. Longtime members Joel Ekman, Shawn Economaki and Jim Root left the band in 2006, 2011 and 2014, respectively. Martucci and Chow were first featured with the band on the Burbank Duology. Hydrograd is the first album to feature Christian Martucci and Johny Chow since each joining the band in 2014 and 2012, respectively.

Albums

Studio albums

Live albums

Extended plays

Video albums

Singles

Promotional singles

Music videos

Demos
1993 Demo
1994 Demo
1996 Demo
2000 Demo
2001 Demo
2010 Demo
2012/2013 Dead Generation Demos

Other appearances

See also
List of songs recorded by Stone Sour

Notes

A  "Say You'll Haunt Me" did not enter the Billboard Hot 100, but peaked at number 10 on the Bubbling Under Hot 100 Singles chart, which acts as an extension to the Hot 100.
B   "Gone Sovereign" and "Absolute Zero" were released together as a double A-side single on iTunes.

References

External links
 Official website
 Stone Sour at AllMusic
 

Discography
Heavy metal group discographies